Johnny Dutch born January 20 1989 and is a USA Track and Field athlete.

Film career
Johnny wrote and produced the short 'The Boy and Boris' which has been featured on Aspire Television and the Jack Daniel's Real to Reel Competition event. In addition, his film projects have been selected into festivals such as PBS's Reel 13 Short Contest, Toronto Black Film Festival, Children's Film Festival Seattle, Raleigh Film and Art Festival, Urban Mediamakers Film Festival Atlanta, Las Vegas Black Film Festival, National Black Film Festival, and many others.

His latest feature "FLOAT" can be seen on David Kirkman's Woke Nation Entertainment YouTube Channel.

Athletic career
While attending Clayton High, Dutch was a nine-time state champion in both hurdle events.  At the 2007 Pan American Junior Athletics Championships, Dutch won gold in the 110 m hurdles (99.0 cm) and 400 m hurdles.  He also won a silver medal in the 4x400 m relay.

At the 2008 Olympic Trials, Dutch finished 5th in the 400 m hurdles with a time of 48.52.  At the 2008 World Junior Championships in Athletics, he won a silver medal in the 400 m hurdles behind fellow American Jeshua Anderson.

At the 2009 USA Outdoor Track & Field Championships, Dutch finished second to Bershawn Jackson to earn a bid at the 2009 World Championships in Athletics. At the 2009 World Championships, Dutch did not make it past the semifinals and finished 16th overall.

At the 2014 USA Outdoor Track and Field Championships in Sacramento, California, Dutch won his first American Title in the 400 m hurdles with a time of 48.93.

Personal bests

References

External links

South Carolina Gamecocks bio

1989 births
Living people
American male hurdlers
World Athletics Championships athletes for the United States
Track and field athletes from Raleigh, North Carolina
USA Outdoor Track and Field Championships winners